KLOA (1240 AM) is a radio station broadcasting a sports format, licensed to and serving Ridgecrest, California, United States. The station is currently owned by Adelman Broadcasting, Inc. and features programming from CBS Sports Radio.

Previous logo

References

External links
FCC History Cards for KLOA

LOA
Sports radio stations in the United States
Ridgecrest, California
Radio stations established in 1956
1956 establishments in California
CBS Sports Radio stations